Celaenia excavata, the bird dropping spider of Australia and New Zealand, derives its name from mimicking bird droppings to avoid predators, mainly birds. However, there are other species of spider that resemble bird droppings, for example species of Mastophora (a bolas spider).

Habitat and appearance
The males are much smaller than the females, about 2.5 mm as opposed to 12 mm. The females have up to 13 egg sacs, with about 200 eggs each, strung together with strong threads. Their toxicity is unknown, but may be able to cause mild illness in humans.

Celaenia excavata is found throughout large parts of eastern and southern Australia and have also been recorded in central Australia; they are also seen in suburban gardens. 

The egg sacs of the bird-dropping spider are large, marbled brown colored spheres, each about 12 mm in diameter and containing over 200 eggs. Up to 13 sacs are silked together in a group, beneath which the spider may be found awaiting prey.

Hunting
Its diet consists almost exclusively of male moths, which it hunts at night by mimicking the scent of female moths.

The bird dropping spider stays motionless on its web during the day, only hunting for prey at night. It hangs down from a single silk thread and releases a pheromone which mimics the sex smells released by female moths. When a moth comes near, the spider will capture it with its powerful front legs.

References

External links
 University of Southern Queensland: Bird dropping spider
  Bird dropping spider pictures and info

Araneidae
Spiders of Australia
Taxa named by Carl Ludwig Koch
Spiders described in 1867
Spiders of New Zealand